The 1973 European Baseball Championship was held in the Netherlands and was won by the Netherlands for the third time in a row. Italy finished as runner-up.

Standings

References
(NL) European Championship Archive at honkbalsite

European Baseball Championship
European Baseball Championship
1973
1973 in Dutch sport